Dizzy Pilots is a 1943 short subject directed by Jules White starring American slapstick comedy team The Three Stooges (Moe Howard, Larry Fine and Curly Howard). It is the 74th entry in the series released by Columbia Pictures starring the comedians, who released 190 shorts for the studio between 1934 and 1959.

Plot
The Stooges are a trio of aviators known as the Wrong Brothers in the "Republic of Cannabeer, P.U." who receive an army draft notice. The notice says the brothers have been granted a 30-day deferment of duty on account of their claims that the aircraft they are inventing, the “Buzzard”, will revolutionize flying. Curly proudly announces that their aircraft has put them among other "great inventors" like Robert Fulton, Thomas Edison, Alexander Graham Bell and Don Ameche.

The boys get to work, but a series of mishaps cause them to get sidetracked; Moe twice gets knocked into a tub of quick-drying melted rubber. The first time it happens, Larry and Curly try to get the rubber off Moe by expanding the rubber with hydrogen, turning him into a human balloon. Unfortunately, Moe floats to the top of the aircraft hangar and into the sky, and Larry and Curly take aim with a shotgun and blast him to safety, resulting in Moe falling down in his Long Johns into a nearby well.

Later, just as the boys are ready to test the Buzzard, they realize the aircraft is too wide to move out of the hangar. This problem is solved when the Stooges saw a larger opening in the hangar. But then they have another problem trying to start the propeller. Moe pushes the propeller to get it to start, but the propeller swings back at him and carries him for numerous revolutions before he is thrown off - where he lands in the same tub of rubber cement from before.

They eventually begin a test flight of the aircraft for a pair of aircraft company officials from the Sky Aircraft Company, but things begin to go awry. Curly accidentally breaks the rudder cable, Moe orders him to throw out the clutch, Curly is unable to find it, so he throws out the gear shift lever instead. Moe attempts to repair the rudder cable but fails and the aircraft turns upside down and the three fall right back into the same well as before, dousing the aircraft officials with water as they splash into the well's bottom.

As expected, the Stooges are drafted into the army, where they run afoul with their drill sergeant (Richard Fiske), disrupting marching and weapons handling drills. Eventually, the three of them have had enough. They knock out the drill instructor by hitting him with their guns, allowing them to escape.

Cast

Credited
 Curly Howard as Curly Wrong (credited as Curly)
 Larry Fine as Larry Wrong (credited as Larry)
 Moe Howard as Moe Wrong (credited as Moe)

Uncredited
 Harry Semels as Sky Aircraft Co. Representative
 Al Thompson as Sky Aircraft Co. Representative
 Bobby Barber as Private (archive footage)
 Charles Dorety as Private (archive footage)
 Richard Fiske as Sergeant (archive footage)
 Judy Malcolm as Girl in Hangar (scene deleted) 
 Sethma Williams as Girl in Hangar (scene deleted)

Production notes
Dizzy Pilots was filmed on April 6–9, 1943. The boot camp segment is stock footage from 1940's Boobs in Arms, with the exception of the ending shot where the Stooges escape from the base itself.

The gag of an aircraft being too large to take out of a hangar was reused in 1972 on The New Scooby-Doo Movies episode featuring the Stooges as guest stars ("The Ghost of the Red Baron").

Reception
DVD Talk critic Stuart Galbraith IV noted that Dizzy Pilots was the "last genuinely excellent Curly short" with "a set-up similar to Higher Than a Kite though executed infinitely better."

References

Notes

Citations

Bibliography

 Pauley, Jim. The Three Stooges Hollywood Filming Locations. Solana Beach, California: Santa Monica Press, 2012. {{ISBN} 978-1-59580-070-1}}.
 Solomon, Jon. The Complete Three Stooges: The Official Filmography and Three Stooges Companion. Glendale, California: Comedy III Productions, Inc., 2002. .

External links
 
 
Dizzy Pilots at threestooges.net

1943 films
The Three Stooges films
American aviation films
American black-and-white films
Films directed by Jules White
1943 comedy films
Military humor in film
Columbia Pictures short films
American slapstick comedy films
1940s English-language films
1940s American films